Echinops  is a genus of about 120 species of flowering plants in the family Asteraceae, commonly known as globe thistles. They have spiny foliage and produce blue or white spherical flower heads. They are native to Europe, east to central Asia, and south to the mountains of tropical Africa. Globe thistle is the host plant of weevil Larinus vulpes.

Species
Species include:

Echinops adenocaulos
Echinops bannaticus
Echinops chantavicus
Echinops echinatus
Echinops exaltatus
Echinops giganteus
Echinops gmelinii
Echinops graecus
Echinops humilis
Echinops latifolius
Echinops longisetus
Echinops nivens
Echinops niveus
Echinops orientalis
Echinops ritro (syn. Echinops ruthenicus)
Echinops sahyadricus
Echinops setifer
Echinops sphaerocephalus
Echinops spinosissimus
Echinops tournefortii
Echinops tschimganicus

Gallery

References

 
Asteraceae genera
Taxa named by Carl Linnaeus